Toxolasma cylindrellus, the pale lilliput naiad, pale lilliput pearly mussel, or pale lilliput, is a species of freshwater mussel, an aquatic bivalve mollusk in the family Unionidae, the river mussels. Its host is the Northern studfish

Distribution
This species is endemic to the United States. It has experienced a great range reduction and is currently found only in the Paint Rock River drainage in northern Alabama and southeastern Tennessee.  The most recent surveys failed to find this species in the Tennessee portion of the drainage.

References

External links
Toxolasma cylindrellus. The Nature Conservancy.

Endemic fauna of Tennessee
Endemic fauna of Alabama
cylindrellus
Molluscs described in 1868
Taxonomy articles created by Polbot